Gerhard 'Pote' Human (born ) is a South African rugby union coach. As a player, Human was an eighth man.

Coaching
After finishing playing, Human became a coach.

He was the assistant to Todd Louden at the Ricoh Black Rams in Japan in 2008 and 2009, helping them win promotion from the Top East League in his first season and avoiding relegation in the second.

After Heyneke Meyer was hired as Director of Rugby for the Houston SaberCats in July 2021, it was announced that Human would join the club as head coach on September 6, 2021.

References

South African rugby union players
South African rugby union coaches
Houston SaberCats coaches
Living people
1959 births
Rugby union number eights
Eastern Province Elephants players
Free State Cheetahs players